Werden is a southern borough of the city of Essen in Germany. It belongs to the city district IX Werden/Kettwig/Bredeney and has 9,998 inhabitants as of June 30, 2006.


History 
The history of Werden can be traced back to St. Ludger, who founded Werden Abbey at the end of the 8th century. His stone coffin is preserved in the crypt. In 1317, Werden was granted city rights. The Abbey buildings have housed the Folkwang Hochschule since 1927.

The  ("Silver Bible"), traditionally ascribed to bishop Ulfilas, was discovered in the abbey in the 16th century.

The town was merged into Essen on August 1, 1929.

Traffic 
The Bundesstraße 224 goes through the centre of Werden, with a high traffic load. Essen-Werden railway station provides access to the S-Bahn trains of the Rhine-Ruhr S-Bahn's S6 line.

References 

Essen
Former municipalities in North Rhine-Westphalia